The 2018 Sudamérica Rugby Sevens was the twelfth edition of the Sudamérica Rugby Sevens, the continental championship for rugby sevens in South America. Five national teams competed for two slots, not only for the 2018 Hong Kong Sevens qualification tournament, but also for participation at the 2018 Rugby World Cup Sevens.

Teams

 Maple Leafs

 Academy
 Falcons

 Notes:

Final standings

Main Tournament

The main South America Sevens series took place over two legs, one in Punta del Este, Uruguay, and one in Viña del Mar, Chile.

The initial seedings were as follows:

Punta del Este Sevens
All times Uruguay Standard Time (UTC−03:00)

Pool Stage

Group A

Group B

Group C

Knockout round

Challenge Trophy

5th Place

Cup

Viña del Mar Sevens

All times in Chile Summer Time (UTC−03:00)

Pool Stage

Group A

Group B

Group C

Knockout round

Challenge Trophy

5th Place

Cup

See also
 2018 Rugby World Cup Sevens qualifying – Men

References

2018 rugby sevens competitions
2018 in South American rugby union
Rugby sevens competitions in South America
International rugby union competitions hosted by Chile
International rugby union competitions hosted by Uruguay
Punta Del Este Sevens
2018 in Chilean sport
2018 in Uruguayan sport
January 2018 sports events in South America